The Cuyuna 430 and Cuyuna 340 are a family of two-stroke, twin-cylinder piston snowmobile engines that were redesigned to serve as  ultralight aircraft powerplants.

Development
While developing the Pterodactyl Pfledge flying wing ultralight in the late 1970s, designer Jack McCornack experimented with a number of possible engines. Early flights used a German-made Sachs engine, but the high exchange rate and long lead times for this engine convinced him to try other options.

McCornack settled on a snowmobile engine produced by the Cuyuna Development Company as having the best potential. In 1979 he modified the engine with a crankcase extension, an additional main bearing, lowered the compression ratio using an additional head gasket and substituted a smaller  Mikuni carburetor, amongst other modifications. The original snowmobile engine produced . Lowering the compression ratio not only de-rated the engine, but also made pull-starting easier and allowed it to run on lower-octane regular auto fuel. The resulting engine worked well, was de-rated to produce  at 5,500 rpm and proved reliable in service.

Citing liability concerns over producing a two-stroke engine for human-carrying aircraft applications, Cuyuna declined to produce the modified engine. Instead, Cuyuna decided that the resulting engine was different enough from the base snowmobile engine that they would supply assembled and test-run shortblocks as parts to McCornack's company, Pterodactyl Limited, who would then complete the engines and be the manufacturer, allowing Cuyuna to continue producing snowmobile engines.

After two years of poor sales of snowmobiles, due to a dearth of snow and no lawsuits against Pterodactyl Limited regarding the engine, Cuyuna agreed to build the engines themselves.

The 430 was also produced in a reduced  bore version called the 340.

Variants
340D
Direct drive version,  at 5500 rpm, recoil starter.
340R
Reduction drive version using a belt drive system,  at 5500 rpm, recoil starter
430D
Direct drive version,  at 5500 rpm, recoil starter.
430F
Reduction drive version using a 3:1 gearbox system, dual carburetors, producing .
430R
Reduction drive version using a belt drive system,  at 5500 rpm, recoil starter
UL II
 version

Applications

Specifications (430D)

References

Air-cooled aircraft piston engines
Two-stroke aircraft piston engines